Furio is a surname of Italian origin.

Notable persons with that name include:
 Sonia Furió (1937–1996), Mexican actress
 Carlos Furió Más (born c. 1970), (fl. 2000), Spanish research psychologist
 Dominic Furio (born 1981), American football player

See also 
Furio (given name)
Iván Furios

Footnotes